Mediator is a multiprotein complex that functions as a transcriptional coactivator in all eukaryotes. It was discovered in 1990 in the lab of Roger D. Kornberg, recipient of the 2006 Nobel Prize in Chemistry. Mediator complexes interact with transcription factors and RNA polymerase II. The main function of mediator complexes is to transmit signals from the transcription factors to the polymerase.

Mediator complexes are variable at the evolutionary, compositional and conformational levels. The first image shows only one "snapshot" of what a particular mediator complex might be composed of, but it certainly does not accurately depict the conformation of the complex in vivo. During evolution, mediator has become more complex. The yeast Saccharomyces cerevisiae (a simple eukaryote) is thought to have up to 21 subunits in the core mediator (exclusive of the CDK module), while mammals have up to 26.

Individual subunits can be absent or replaced by other subunits under different conditions. Also, there are many intrinsically disordered regions in mediator proteins, which may contribute to the conformational flexibility seen both with and without other bound proteins or protein complexes. A more realistic model of a mediator complex without the CDK module is shown in the second figure.

The mediator complex is required for the successful transcription by RNA polymerase II. Mediator has been shown to make contacts with the polymerase in the transcription preinitiation complex. A recent model showing the association of the polymerase with mediator in the absence of DNA is shown in the figure to the left. In addition to RNA polymerase II, mediator must also associate with transcription factors and DNA. A model of such interactions is shown in the figure to the right. Note that the different morphologies of mediator do not necessarily mean that one of the models is correct; rather those differences may reflect the flexibility of mediator as it interacts with other molecules. For example, after binding the enhancer and core promoter, the mediator complex undergoes a compositional change in which the kinase module dissociates from the complex to allow association with RNA polymerase II and transcriptional activation.

The Mediator complex is located within the cell nucleus. It is required for the successful transcription of nearly all class II gene promoters in yeast. It works in the same manner in mammals. The mediator functions as a coactivator and binds to the C-terminal domain of RNA polymerase II holoenzyme, acting as a bridge between this enzyme and transcription factors.

Structure 

The yeast mediator complex is approximately as massive as a small subunit of a eukaryotic ribosome. The yeast mediator is composed of 25 subunits, while the mammalian mediator complexes are slightly larger. Mediator can be divided into 4 main parts: The head, middle, tail, and the transiently associated CDK8 kinase module.

Mediator subunits have many intrinsically disordered regions called "splines", which may be important to allow the structural changes of the mediator that change the function of the complex. The figure shows how the splines of the Med 14 subunit connect a large portion of the complex together while still allowing flexibility.

Mediator complexes that lack a subunit have been found or produced. These smaller mediators can still function normally in some activity, but lack other capabilities. This indicates a somewhat independent function of some of the subunits while being part of the larger complex.

Another example of structural variability is seen in vertebrates, in which 3 paralogues of subunits of the cyclin-dependent kinase module have evolved by 3 independent gene duplication events followed by sequence divergence. There is a report that mediator forms stable associations with a particular type of non-coding RNA, ncRNA-a. These stable associations have also been shown to regulate gene expression in vivo, and are prevented by mutations in MED12 that produce the human disease FG syndrome. Thus, the structure of a mediator complex can be augmented by RNA as well as proteinaceous transcription factors.

Function 

Mediator was originally discovered because it was important for RNA polymerase II function, but it has many more functions than just interactions at the transcription start site.

RNA polymerase II-Mediator core initiation complex 
Mediator is a crucial component for transcription initiation. Mediator interacts with the pre-initiation complex, composed of RNA Polymerase II and general transcription factors TFIIB, TFIID, TFIIE, TFIIF, and TFIIH to stabilize and initiate transcription. Studies of Mediator-RNA Pol II contacts in budding yeast have emphasized the importance of TFIIB-Mediator contacts in the formation of the complex. Interactions of Mediator with TFIID in the initiation complex has been shown.

The Structure of a core Mediator (cMed) that's associated with a core pre-initiation complex was elucidated.

RNA synthesis
The preinitiation complex, which contains mediator, transcription factors, a nucleosome and RNA polymerase II, is important to position the polymerase for the start of transcription. Before RNA synthesis can occur, the polymerase must dissociate from mediator. This appears to be accomplished by phosphorylation of part of the polymerase by a kinase. Importantly, mediator and transcription factors do not dissociate from the DNA at the time polymerase begins transcription. Rather, the complex remains at the promoter to recruit another RNA polymerase to begin another round of transcription.

There is some evidence to suggest that mediator in a yeast is involved in regulating RNA polymerase III (Pol III) transcripts of tRNAs In support of that evidence, an independent report showed specific association of mediator with Pol III in Saccharomyces cerevisiae. Those authors also reported specific associations with RNA polymerase I and proteins involved in transcription elongation and RNA processing, supporting other evidence of mediator's involvement in elongation and processing.

Chromatin organization
Mediator is involved in "looping" of chromatin, which brings distant regions of a chromosome into closer physical proximity. The ncRNA-a mentioned above is involved in such looping. Enhancer RNAs (eRNAs) can function similarly.

In addition to the looping of euchromatin, mediator appears to be involved in formation or maintenance of heterochromatin at centromeres and telomeres.

Signal transduction
TGFβ signaling at the cell membrane results in 2 different intracellular pathways. One of them depends on MED15, while the other is independent of MED15. In both human cells and Caenorhabditis elegans MED15 is involved in lipid homeostasis through the pathway involving SREBPs In the model plant Arabidopsis thaliana the ortholog of MED15 is required for signaling by the plant hormone Salicylic acid, while MED25 is required for the transcriptional activation of jasmonate and shade signalling responses. Two components of the CDK module (MED12 and MED13) are involved in the Wnt signaling pathway MED23 is involved in RAS/MAPK/ERK pathway This abbreviated review shows the versatility of individual mediator subunits, and leads to the idea that mediator is an end-point of signaling pathways.

Human disease
Involvement of mediator in various human diseases has been reviewed. Since inhibiting one interaction of a disease-causing signaling pathway with a subunit of mediator may not inhibit general transcription needed for normal function, mediator subunits are attractive candidates for therapeutic drugs.

Interactions

A method employing very gentle cell lysis in yeast followed by co-immunoprecipitation with an antibody to a mediator subunit (Med 17) has confirmed almost all previously reported or predicted interactions and revealed many previously unsuspected specific interactions of various proteins with mediator.

MED 1 

A discussion of all mediator subunits is beyond the scope of this article, but details of one of the subunits is illustrative of the types of information that may be gathered for other subunits.

regulation by Micro RNAs
Micro RNAs are involved in regulating the expression of many proteins. Med1 is targeted by miR-1, which is important in gene regulation in cancers. The tumor suppressor miR-137 also regulates MED1.

Mouse embryonic development
Null mutants die at an early gestational age (embryonic day 11.5). By investigating hypomorphic mutants (which can survive 2 days longer), it was found that placental defects were primarily lethal and that there were also defects in cardiac and hepatic development, but many other organs were normal

Mouse cells and tissues

Conditional mutations can be produced in mice which affect only specific cells or tissues at specific times, so that the mouse can develop to adulthood and the adult phenotype can be studied. In one case, MED1 was found to participate in controlling the timing of events of meiosis in male mice. Conditional mutants in keratinocytes show differences in skin wound healing. A conditional mutant in mice was found to change dental epithelium into epidermal epithelium, which caused hair to grow associated with the incisors.

Subunit composition 

The Mediator complex is composed at least 31 subunits in all eukaryotes studied: MED1, MED4, MED6, MED7, MED8, MED9, MED10, MED11, MED12, MED13, MED13L, MED14, MED15, MED16, MED17, MED18, MED19, MED20, MED21, MED22, MED23, MED24, MED25, MED26, MED27, MED28, MED29, MED30, MED31, CCNC, and CDK8. There are three fungal-specific components, referred to as Med2, Med3 and Med5.

The subunits form at least three structurally distinct submodules. The head and the middle modules interact directly with RNA polymerase II, whereas the elongated tail module interacts with gene-specific regulatory proteins. Mediator containing the CDK8 module is less active than Mediator lacking this module in supporting transcriptional activation.

The head module contains: MED6, MED8, MED11, SRB4/MED17, SRB5/MED18, ROX3/MED19, SRB2/MED20 and SRB6/MED22.
The middle module contains: MED1, MED4, NUT1/MED5, MED7, CSE2/MED9, NUT2/MED10, SRB7/MED21 and SOH1/MED31. CSE2/MED9 interacts directly with MED4.
The tail module contains: MED2, PGD1/MED3, RGR1/MED14, GAL11/MED15 and SIN4/MED16.
The CDK8 module contains: MED12, MED13, CCNC and CDK8. Individual preparations of the Mediator complex lacking one or more distinct subunits have been variously termed ARC, CRSP, DRIP, PC2, SMCC and TRAP.

In other species 

Below is a cross-species comparison of mediator complex subunits.

Notes

References 

Protein complexes
Gene expression